The Chinese Ambassador to the United States is the official representative from the People's Republic of China to the United States of America.

List of representatives

This is a list of diplomatic representatives from China to the United States. It includes envoys of the Qing Empire and the Republic of China (ROC) from 1875 to 1978, and those of the People's Republic of China (PRC) since 1973.

Qing Empire

Beiyang Republic

Nationalist Government

For the ambassadors after 1979, see the list of representatives of the Taipei Economic and Cultural Representative Office in the United States.

People's Republic of China

See also
 Embassy of China, Washington, D.C.

References 

 
United States
China